Bill or Billy Baker may refer to:

People
Bill Baker (baseball) (1911–2006), American baseball catcher
Bill Baker (Canadian football) (born 1944), Canadian football player
Bill Baker (ice hockey, born 1882), Canadian hockey player
Bill Baker (ice hockey, born 1956), American hockey player
Bill Baker (racing driver) (1931–1978), American NASCAR driver
Bill John Baker, Principal Chief of the Cherokee Nation
Billy Baker (footballer, born 1892) (1892–1980), English professional footballer
Billy Baker (footballer, born 1894) (1894–1972), English professional footballer
Billy Baker (footballer, born 1905) (1905–1975), English professional footballer
Billy Baker (footballer, born 1920) (1920–2005), Welsh professional footballer
Billy Baker (musician), former member of the Del McCoury Band
Billy Baker (boxer) (born 1894), English professional boxer
Wilfred Baker (1920–2000), known as Bill, British Conservative MP
William F. Baker (engineer) (born 1953), known as Bill, American structural engineer
William P. Baker (born 1940), known as Bill, U.S. Representative from California
William F. Baker (television), American public television executive

Fiction
Billy Baker, character in Andre (film)

See also
William Baker (disambiguation)